Beyond Thee Infinite Beat (subtitled Ravemaster Mixes) is a remix album by Psychic TV. The album is composed of remixed songs from Towards Thee Infinite Beat.

Track listing

CD version
"Money For E. (Remix By David Ball)" - 5:24
Remix - David Ball
"S.M.I.L.E. (Remix By Greedy Beat Syndicate)" - 7:22
Remix - The Greedy Beat Syndicate
"Bliss (Remix By Andy Falconer)" - 4:46
Remix - Andy Falconer
"Horror House (Remix By DJ Sugar Jay)" - 6:46
Remix - DJ Sugar Jay
"I.C. Water (Remix By Evil Eddie)" - 7:01
Remix - Evil Eddie
"Stick Insect (Remix By Dj Global)" - 8:12
Remix - DJ Global
"Money For E. (Remix By Jack The Tab)" - 10:50
Remix - Jack The Tab
(untitled) - 3:16

12" vinyl version
Side A
"Money For E (Remix)" - 5:22
Remix - David Ball
Side B
"Horror House (Remix) (6:49)
Remix - DJ Sugar Jay
Side C
"S.M.I.L.E. (Remix)" - 7:31
Remix - The Greedy Beat Syndicate
"Bliss (Remix)" - 4:44
Remix - Andy Falconer
Side D
"Stick Insect (Remix)" - 5:59
Remix - Evil Eddie
"I. C. Water (Remix)" - 8:11
Remix - DJ Global
Tracks A & B run at 45 rpm.
Tracks D1, D2, C1 & C2 run at 33 ⅓ rpm.

References 

Psychic TV albums
1990 remix albums